Skoatl Point is a volcanic plug located in the formation known as the Chilcotin Group, which lie between the Pacific Ranges of the Coast Mountains and the mid-Fraser River in British Columbia, Canada.

See also
 List of volcanoes in Canada
 Volcanology of Canada

References

Volcanic plugs of British Columbia
One-thousanders of British Columbia
Bonaparte Country
Kamloops Division Yale Land District